José Antonio Primo de Rivera y Sáenz de Heredia, 1st Duke of Primo de Rivera, 3rd Marquess of Estella (24 April 1903 – 20 November 1936), often referred to simply as José Antonio, was a Spanish politician who founded the falangist Falange Española ("Spanish Phalanx"), later Falange Española de las JONS.

The eldest son of General Miguel Primo de Rivera, who governed Spain as dictator from 1923 to 1930, Primo de Rivera worked as a lawyer before entering politics, an enterprise he initially engaged in vowing to defend his deceased father's memory. He founded Falange Española in October 1933, shortly before running as a candidate in the 1933 general election, in which he won a seat in the Congress of Deputies of the Second Spanish Republic. He assumed the role of messianic leader and charged himself with the task of saving Spain in founding a Fascist party, but he encountered difficulties widening his support base during his whole political life.

In 1936, he endorsed the Spanish nationalist military coup against the republic that led to a civil war that he later tried to stop. Imprisoned before the start of the war, he was accused of conspiracy and military rebellion against the government of the republic and was sentenced to death and executed during the first months of the war.

In life, he held the nobiliary title of 3rd Marquess of Estella, Grandee of Spain. In 1948, he was posthumously bestowed the title of Duke of Primo de Rivera, which was subsequently passed to his brother Miguel. The image of José Antonio was revered during the war by the Nationalist faction, and after the establishment of Francoist Spain, he was regarded as a martyr, his figure being a tool of the Francoist propaganda apparatus. The inscription of "José Antonio ¡Presente!" could be found in many churches all across Spain.

Biography

Early life 
José Antonio Primo de Rivera was born on Calle de Génova (Madrid) on April 24, 1903, the eldest son of the military officer Miguel Primo de Rivera y Orbaneja (who would later govern Spain as dictator from 1923 to 1930) and Casilda Sáenz de Heredia y Suárez de Argudín. From his father he inherited the title of Marquess of Estella. He never married.

His mother died when he was five years old, and he was subsequently raised by his father's sister. He was privately taught at home, and learned English and French. When at university, he did not attend lectures until the second year of his undergraduate studies. He spent his summer holidays at the country estate of an uncle, where he practiced horse riding and hunting.

Primo de Rivera went on to study law at the University of Madrid between 1917 and 1923. He helped to organize the student union there, Federación Universitaria Escolar, which opposed the higher-education policies of his father. He took undergraduate and graduate courses simultaneously and he obtained both his Bachelor and Doctor degrees in the same year, 1923.

After graduating, he chose the "One-Year Volunteer" option to do his military service while his father was dictator. He served with the Ninth Dragoons of St. James cavalry regiment, stationed at Barcelona. He was court-martialed for punching a superior officer, the future Nationalist army leader, Brigadier General Gonzalo Queipo de Llano.
Queipo de Llano had written a defamatory letter against an uncle of José Antonio and against the Dictator himself. José Antonio, ready to defend the honour of his family abused by the Republican general, went to the café where the latter used to socialize, and after asking whether he was the author of the writing, and after receiving the general's affirmative reply, delivered a spectacular punch that made the general roll on the floor, sparking a free-for-all between the companions of José Antonio and the companions of the general.

Llano had been a Republican in the time of the Rivera dictatorship, but is today remembered mostly as a notorious Francoist war criminal in the Civil War.

Primo de Rivera became a registered lawyer in 1925, and opened an office on a side street of Madrid very near the confluence of three principal avenues.

A relatively successful lawyer not involved nor expected to be involved in politics before 1930, the impetuous José Antonio Primo de Rivera decided to do so after the death of his father in his Parisian self-exile in 1930; this was for him the best way to defend the memory of his father, whose work at government had often been derided.

In 1931, he was invested "Perpetual Dean of the Illustrious College of Lawyers of Madrid".

He ran for office under the banner of the National Monarchist Union and failed to get elected.

He was detained briefly in 1932 for collaboration in General José Sanjurjo's attempted coup.

Falangist leader 

On October 29, 1933, Primo de Rivera launched the Falange Española ("Spanish Phalanx"), a nationalist party, inspired in part with some ideas, such as the necessity of authority, hierarchical order of society, and grassroots populism, that were being expounded in Italy in the Fascist movement. The foundational convention was held in the Teatro de la Comedia of Madrid. He was the keynote speaker and his first address was a criticism of liberal democracy.
Since the liberal state was a servant of [Rousseau] it became not just the trustee of a nation's destiny but also the spectator of electoral contests. What alone mattered to the liberal state was that a certain number of gentlemen be sitting at the polling station, that the voting start at eight o'clock and end at four, that the ballot boxes not get smashed—when being smashed is the noblest aspiration of all ballot boxes—and then to respect the outcome of the voting, as if the outcome was a matter of complete indifference to it. In other words liberal governments did not even believe in their mission, that theirs was a respectable duty, but rather they believed that anyone who disagreed with them and decided to attack the state, whether with good or ill intentions, had the same right as they did to defend it.
During the speech he made his noted remark on the recourse to fists and guns when needed,
And in closing, that if what we want must in some circumstance be attained through the use of violence, that we demur not before the prospect of violence. For who has said, when they say, "Every available means except violence," that the supreme hierarchy of moral values resides in kindness? Who has said that when our feelings are insulted, rather than react like men, we are called upon to reply amiably? Dialogue as a first step of communication is well and good. But there is no option left except fists and guns when someone offends the precepts of justice or the fatherland.. Informe Semanal. November 20, 1986. Part II, minutes 0:31 to 1:08.

Stanley Payne argues that Rivera's view that violence was acceptable if done for a just cause was paralleled by that of the Spanish Left, who held similar views on the use of violence; unlike the Italian fascists, the Falange never developed a sophisticated theory for their doctrine of violence. Payne argues that because his father had ruled as a dictator with relatively minimal violence during the quieter 1920s, Rivera naively assumed he could impose a new authoritarian system with relatively limited violence, but he would eventually find himself caught in a spiral of killing that he could not control. When he founded the Falange, Antonio was more reluctant to use violence than other leading members of the party; he did not seem to expect violence from the political Left to be directed against the party. However, after Juan Cuéllar's death, he seemed to overcome his reluctance and thus intermittent killings on both sides would continue.

Rivera's closing words made explicit his Romantic nationalism:
In a poetic sweep we will raise this fervent devotion to Spain; we will make sacrifices, we will renounce the easy life and we will triumph, triumph that—you know this well—we shall not obtain in the upcoming elections. In these elections vote the lesser evil. But your Spain will not be born out of them, nor does our frame for action reside there. That is a murky atmosphere, spent, like a tavern's after a night of dissipation. Our station is not there. I am a candidate, yes, but I take part in these elections without faith or respect. And I say this now, when so doing may rest me every vote. I couldn't care less. We are not going to squabble with the establishment over the unsavory left-overs of a soiled banquet. Our station is outside though we may provisionally pass by the other one. Our place is out in the clear air, beneath a moonlit sky, cradling a rifle, and the stars overhead. Let the others party on. We outside in tense vigil; earnest and self-confident we divine the sunrise in the joy of our hearts.
He was a candidate in the general election of November 19 for the umbrella organization "Unión Agraria y Ciudadana," part of the broad conservative coalition Confederación Española de Derechas Autónomas (CEDA). He was elected to the Parliament as a representative of Cádiz.

In his first parliamentary intervention he answered Gil-Robles—the founder of CEDA—who had just spoken out against all totalitarian forms of government for arrogating to themselves the attributes of God and crushing the personality of the individual: 
We believe that the state does not have to justify its behaviour at every turn, just as no individual or social class does, in so far as it holds to a guiding principle all the time. All the while the state is made out to be God by Rousseau's idea that the state, or the will of those it represents, is always right. What makes the state like God is the belief that the will of the state, embodied by absolute monarchs in the past and now by the popular vote, is always right. The monarch may have erred; the popular vote may err because neither truth nor goodness derives from an act or assertion of the will. Goodness and truth are perennial tributaries of reason, and to ascertain whether one is in the right it is not enough to ask the king—whose dictate seemed always just to his supporters—nor enough to canvass the people—whose decision is always right according to the disciples of Rousseau. What must be done rather is to verify whether our actions and our thoughts are in agreement at every step with a permanent aspiration.

On February 11, 1934, Falange merged with Ramiro Ledesma's Juntas de Ofensiva Nacional-Sindicalista to create the Falange Española de las JONS under José Antonio's leadership. The antisemitic positions within FE de las JONS were mainly led by Onésimo Redondo, with Ledesma and Primo de Rivera largely indifferent to the issue; however Falangists attacked the Jewish-owned SEPU department stores in the spring of 1935; In the view of Gonzalo Álvarez Chillida, both José Antonio and Ledesma probably thought that such antisemitic raids could enhance mobilization within the purportedly threatened small-business sector. He shared with other rightists the belief that violence was legitimate against a Republic that he perceived as influenced by communists, Jews and Freemasons.

The upper-class José Antonio abandoned the tie and suit and took on the new blue-shirt Falange uniform (despite later mocking JAP militants because of this, the Falangists were originally dressed in suit and tie); the uniform, adopted in October 1935, was deliberately chosen as a reference to Italian Fascism.

In 1935 Primo de Rivera collaborated in editing the lyrics of the Falangist anthem, "Cara al Sol" (Face to the Sun).

Every member of the Falange had to obey unquestioningly. They were told: 
The honour and task of Falange must be gauged by those who carry the burden of leadership on their shoulders. Do not forget that one of the rules of our code of ethics is to have faith in the leaders. Your leaders are always right.
In the general election of February 16, 1936, Falange won only 0.7% of the vote; but the wave of instability which greeted the victory of the Popular Front—a left-wing coalition of anarchists, communists, socialists, liberal republicans like the radicals, and others—caused an influx of new members, and the minuscule party grew to more than 40,000 members by July.

Imprisonment and death 
On March 14, 1936, he was arrested in Madrid and charged with illegal possession of firearms (at that time, Spain was awash in privately held weapons on the part of all political factions). Nine weeks later he was transferred to the prison in Alicante. In both Madrid and in Alicante, he was able to maintain intermittent secret contact with the Falange leadership and, several times, with General Emilio Mola. On October 3 he was charged with conspiracy against the Republic and military insurrection, both capital offences, even though he had been imprisoned long before the insurrection of July 18. Primo de Rivera conducted his own defence. On November 18 he was found guilty by a people's tribunal and sentenced to death by firing squad. The three career judges who participated in the trial, along with the popular tribunal, asked for the death sentence be commuted to life imprisonment but this was rejected by the majority of government ministers (the two ministers from Izquierda Republicana voted against the death sentence). The sentence was carried out on November 20 by local authorities in Alicante.

It is said by some that the Republic offered the Nationalists a prisoner exchange involving Primo de Rivera and a son of the Republic's head of government Francisco Largo Caballero and that Franco turned down the offer. Others contend that it was the Republican government who rejected the deal of the Nationalists and that General Franco approved several failed commando raids on the Alicante prison to try to rescue José Antonio. Either way the death of the founder of Falange rid the general of a formidable rival. Perhaps tellingly, it was well known that the two men disliked each other. After one of the two meetings they had, Franco dismissed José Antonio as "a playboy pinturero" (a foppish playboy).

Elizabeth Bibesco's last novel, The Romantic, published in 1940, starts with a dedication to José Antonio Primo de Rivera, whom she had known during her stay in Madrid where her husband, Prince Antoine Bibesco, who was a diplomat from Romania in Spain between 1927 to 1931: “To José Antonio Primo de Rivera. I promised you a book before it was begun. It is yours now that it is finished –Those we love die for us only when we die–”.

Post-mortem relevance 

Falange joined the military uprising against the Republic. The initially marginal party gained ascendancy over the course of the war, partly as a result of its prominent role in the brutal repression that took place behind Nationalist lines. Nevertheless, the party lost autonomy, and in 1937 was made wholly subservient to the will of General Franco when he had Primo de Rivera's temporary replacement, Manuel Hedilla Larrey, thrown in jail, tried and sentenced to death (although his sentence was commuted). Franco decreed the merging of the Falange Española de las JONS with the Carlist traditionalists through the Unification Decree, and became the national chief of the new party, FET y de las JONS.

The reign of Francisco Franco nurtured a convenient cult of personality around the dead figure of Primo de Rivera whom Falangists dubbed "El Ausente" (The Missing One). This name was created during the period after de Rivera's execution but before this was officially confirmed to the Nationalist public at large by its leadership on 18 July 1938. While the Falangist leadership knew the truth, they chose to keep it a secret for fear of the impact it would have on morale, though rumours of his death would continue to circulate for the period. Thus until this date many Falangists had lived in hope that de Rivera would still return (commonly saying "when José Antonio comes back") and began referring to him as "The Absent One", a reference to the Falange's tradition of calling "present!" when the names of the fallen were read out. The founder of Falange was anointed a martyr of the "crusade against Marxism." Notwithstanding the apparent veneration by the Francoist State, it remains true that the Missing One's demise had removed a dangerous opponent: Primo de Rivera had been Marquess, a doctor of civil law, a political thinker; Franco owned no comparable pedigree, no comparable education and no personal ideology.

The postwar cult of personality had two ubiquitous icons. The first, a funereal slab placed on the external wall of many churches and cathedrals which bore the crowning inscription, Caídos por Dios y por España ("Fallen for God and for Spain"), followed by a list of local Nationalists killed during the war; Primo de Rivera's name headed every list. The second was the rallying cry, "José Antonio—¡Presente!," a figurative reply to an imaginary roll call invoking his ghostly attendance or immanence.

With the arrival of democratic rule, the legacy of Primo de Rivera and the cult of personality created by the Spanish state started to wane circumspectly. In 1981, the Madrid City Council moved to reinstate the original name of its grand avenue, the Gran Vía, which Franco had renamed "Avenida José Antonio Primo de Rivera" in 1939. However, as late as March 2005, the Guadalajara City Council removed a memorial to the founder of Falange under cover of darkness.

Burial 
At the end of the war in 1939, the mortal remains of Primo de Rivera were carried on the shoulders of Falangist relay teams from Alicante to Madrid (a 300-kilometre journey) and provisionally interred at El Escorial. The church had contained the pantheon of Spanish monarchs but Primo de Rivera was buried directly in front of the altar.

Burial at the Valley of the Fallen 
In 1959, Primo de Rivera was exhumed and re-interred 13 km away in the basilica of the Valley of the Fallen, located in the Guadarrama mountain range.
Between 1975 and 2019 Francisco Franco was buried nearby. 

In the context of making the site less partisan, Franco's remains were removed from the Valley. This did not establish a clear precedent for moving Primo de Rivera, given that he died a victim of the Civil War like most of the other burials at the site. However, in late 2022 it was reported that Primo de Rivera's family had requested the exhumation of his remains on the grounds that the deceased wanted a Roman Catholic burial. The Democratic Memory Law of 2022 envisaged the future of the Valley of the Fallen as a civil cemetery and accordingly the government proposed to deconsecrate the crypt of the church in order to promote national reconciliation.

Ideology

He espoused an elitist understanding of politics, influenced by the ideas of Ortega y Gasset. His political thought fascistised as he progressively radicalised in an anti-conservative direction.

Primo de Rivera put much faith on corporatism, one of the few early Falangist tenets framed in positive terms, adopted from Italian Fascism.

Regarding political violence, he early alluded to what he famously termed as the "dialectics of fists and guns", already stating during the Falange foundation event at the Teatro de la Comedia, that in order to fulfill the desired cultural and historical regeneration of Spain, "if this has to be achieved through violence, we shall not be stopped by violence".

Willing to offer an alternative to the most basic fundamentals behind liberal democracy, he also non-accidentally addressed some words of scorn to "that terrible man who was called Juan Jacobo Rousseau" during the foundational meeting of the Falange.

Just as other Falangists, Primo de Rivera partially embraced the sense of Castilianist essentialism from the Generation of '98, but, conversely, he was also distinctly aware of the cultural plurality of the peoples in Spain, and thus the Falangist national project for Spain was framed following the orteguian legacy as one of "unity of destiny in the universal".

It has been noted that at some point he benignly put his hopes on politicians far from his own Fascist stances such as republican Manuel Azaña (in this case for a very brief time) or socialist Indalecio Prieto as potential candidates to alleviate his self-imposed burden for "saving" the country.

According to Álvarez Chillida, Primo de Rivera's written works did not feature a marked antisemitism when compared to other Falangist leaders.

Genealogy

Notes

References

Bibliography 
 
 
 
 
 
 Payne, Stanley G. (1961) Falange. A History of Spanish Fascism. Stanford University Press
 
 
 
 
 Thomas, Hugh. "The Hero in the Empty Room: Jose Antonio and Spanish Fascism," Journal of Contemporary History (1966) 1#1 pp. 174–182 in JSTOR
 
 Velarde Fuertes, Juan. "José Antonio y la economía" Grafite ediciones.

External links

 

1903 births
1936 deaths
Spanish syndicalists
Acción Española
Burials in the Community of Madrid
Dukes of Spain
Executed politicians
Fascist writers
Grandees of Spain
Leaders of political parties in Spain
Marquesses of Spain
Members of the Congress of Deputies (Spain)
National syndicalists
People killed by the Second Spanish Republic
People executed by Spain by firing squad
People from Madrid
Spanish anti-communists
Spanish fascists
Spanish nationalists
Executed Spanish people
Spanish people of the Spanish Civil War (National faction)
Spanish Roman Catholics
20th-century Spanish poets
20th-century male writers
Spanish Falangists
Jose Antonio
Falangist politicians
Members of the Congress of Deputies of the Second Spanish Republic
Spanish newspaper founders